Balboa (Valboa in Galician language) is a village and municipality located in the region of El Bierzo (province of León, Castile and León, Spain).

It is one of Galician speaking councils of El Bierzo

Pedanías 

The parishes belonging to the municipality are:
 Balboa
 Cantejeira
 Pumarín
 Ruidelamas
 Castañeira
 Castañoso
 Source Olive
 Chandevillar
 Ruideferros
 Valverde do Camín
 Villarmarín
 Villafeile
 Lamagrande
  Quintela
 Villanueva
 Parajís
 Villariños

Although Galician names are unofficial, they are the original and commonly used by the inhabitants of the municipality, since the names in Castilian are mere translations of the original names.

References 

Municipalities in El Bierzo